Bertalan Peak is a peak  high, standing at the northwest side of the head of Montecchi Glacier in the Victory Mountains, Victoria Land. It was mapped by the United States Geological Survey from surveys and from U.S. Navy air photos, 1960–64, and named by the Advisory Committee on Antarctic Names for Robert E. Bertalan, U.S. Navy, chief machinery repairman at McMurdo Station, 1967.

References

 

Mountains of Victoria Land
Borchgrevink Coast